George Bowes (1701–1760) was an English MP.

George Bowes may also refer to:

George Bowes (soldier) (1527–1580), English military commander, MP for Morpeth and Knaresborough
George Bowes (rebel) (1517–1545), English commander in border warfare
George Bowes (prospector) (died 1606), prospected and mined for gold in Scotland

See also
John George Bowes (c. 1812–1864), Canadian businessman and politician